Johannes Hauerslev (5 May 1860 – 21 October 1921) was a Danish photographer. He is mainly remembered for his numerous photographs of street scenes and buildings in Copenhagen.

Early life
Hauerslev  was born in Aalborg, the son of Hans Peter Hauerslev and Petrine Jensine Bothilde Anette Martensen.

Career
Hauerslev ran a photographic studio at Fælledvej 9 in Nørrebro from 1887 to 1918. It was after that continued by Alfred Andersen (from c. 1933; Alfred Munk-Andersen).

He was awarded a medal at the 1896 Baltic Exhibition in Malmö and was created a Knight in the order of the Dannebrog in 1910.

He was a member of the Danish Association of Photographers and strongly involved in the establishment of the Photoraphers' House (Fotografernes Stiftelse) at Ruesgade 199 in Copenhagen.

Personal life
Hauerslev was married to Georgine Rosalie Hauerslev. They had one daughter, Katy Hauerslev.  He died on 21 October 1821 in Charlottenlund and was buried in Vestre Cemetery.

Gallery

References

External links

 Johannes Hauerslev at Kunstindeks Danmark

Danish photographers
People from Aalborg
Photographers from Copenhagen
Burials at Vestre Cemetery, Copenhagen
1860 births
1921 deaths